The 2009–10 Montana Grizzlies basketball team represented the University of Montana during the 2009–10 NCAA Division I men's basketball season. The Grizzlies, led by fourth-year head coach Wayne Tinkle, played their home games at Dahlberg Arena and were members of the Big Sky Conference. They finished the season 22–10, 10–6 in Big Sky play to finish tied for third place in the conference regular season standings. Montana won the Big Sky Basketball tournament to earn the conference's automatic berth into the NCAA tournament where they lost in the first round to New Mexico.

Roster

Schedule and results

|-
!colspan=9 style=| Regular season

|-
!colspan=9 style=| Big Sky tournament

|-
!colspan=9 style=| NCAA tournament

References

Montana Grizzlies basketball seasons
Montana
Montana
Montana Grizzlies basketball
Montana Grizzlies basketball